YY1-associated factor 2 is a protein that in humans is encoded by the YAF2 gene.

The protein encoded by this gene interacts with YY1, a zinc finger protein involved in negative regulation of muscle-restricted genes. This gene product itself contains a single N-terminal C2-X10-C2 zinc finger, and in contrast to YY1, is up-regulated during myogenic differentiation. It also facilitates proteolytic cleavage of YY1 by the calcium- activated protease, m-calpain, suggesting a mechanism by which this protein antagonizes the negative effect of YY1.

References

Further reading

External links